Events from the year 1946 in Canada.

Incumbents

Crown 
 Monarch – George VI

Federal government 
 Governor General – the Earl of Athlone (until April 12) then the Viscount Alexander of Tunis
 Prime Minister – William Lyon Mackenzie King
 Chief Justice – Thibaudeau Rinfret (Quebec) 
 Parliament – 20th

Provincial governments

Lieutenant governors 
Lieutenant Governor of Alberta – John C. Bowen   
Lieutenant Governor of British Columbia – William C Woodward (until October 1) then Charles Arthur Banks 
Lieutenant Governor of Manitoba – Roland Fairbairn McWilliams  
Lieutenant Governor of New Brunswick – David Laurence MacLaren 
Lieutenant Governor of Nova Scotia – Henry Ernest Kendall 
Lieutenant Governor of Ontario – Albert Edward Matthews (until December 26) then Ray Lawson 
Lieutenant Governor of Prince Edward Island – Joseph Alphonsus Bernard 
Lieutenant Governor of Quebec – Eugène Fiset 
Lieutenant Governor of Saskatchewan – Reginald John Marsden Parker

Premiers 
Premier of Alberta – Ernest Manning   
Premier of British Columbia – John Hart  
Premier of Manitoba – Stuart Garson  
Premier of New Brunswick – John McNair 
Premier of Nova Scotia – Angus Macdonald 
Premier of Ontario – George A. Drew 
Premier of Prince Edward Island – J. Walter Jones  
Premier of Quebec – Maurice Duplessis 
Premier of Saskatchewan – Tommy Douglas

Territorial governments

Commissioners 
 Controller of Yukon – George A. Jeckell 
 Commissioner of Northwest Territories – Charles Camsell

Events
January 21 – The Bluenose sinks off Haiti.
May 14 – The Canadian Citizenship Act, 1946 is passed. It creates Canadian citizenship separate from the British.
May 31 – All Japanese-Canadians ordered deported to Japan.
April 12 – Sir Harold Alexander appointed the new Governor General of Canada, replacing the Earl of Athlone.
June 23 – The 1946 Vancouver Island earthquake affects Vancouver Island and mainland British Columbia.
June 27 – Canadian Citizenship Act 1946 is enacted, defining a Canadian citizen and including a reference to being a British subject.
July 15 – A royal commission investigates a Soviet spy ring in Canada. Secret information was found to be leaked and among the Canadians held suspect was the one parliamentary delegate of the Labor-Progressive (Communist) Party.
August 3 – A Canadian wheat agreement provided for British purchases of large amounts of Canadian wheat at prices considerably below the world market.
October 14 – Canada Savings Bonds introduced for the first time.
November 8 - Viola Desmond refuses to leave her seat in a movie theatre and is arrested.
The Canadian Army Command and Staff College is established.

Arts and literature
 January 8 – Betty Beaumont, Canadian American site-specific artist, all media
August 29 – Leona Gom, Canadian poet and novelist
October 28 – Sharon Thesen, Canadian poet
November 7 – Diane Francis, Canadian journalist and author

Sport 
April 9 - The Montreal Canadiens win their sixth Stanley Cup by defeating the Boston Bruins four games to one. The deciding Game 5 was played at the Montreal Forum.
April 27 - The Manitoba Junior Hockey League's Winnipeg Monarchs win their third (and final) Memorial Cup by defeating the Ontario Hockey Association Toronto St. Michael's Majors 4 games to 3. All games were played at Maple Leaf Gardens in Toronto.
November - The New York Knicks win the first National Basketball Association game by defeating the Toronto Huskies 68–66 at Maple Leaf Gardens in Toronto.
November 30 - The Toronto Argonauts win their seventh Grey Cup by defeating the Winnipeg Blue Bombers 28 to 6 in the 34th Grey Cup at Varsity Stadium in Toronto.

Births

January to March
 
January 10 – Alexis Nihon, Jr., real estate businessman, Olympic wrestler for The Bahamas (1968) (d.2013)
January 15 – Veronica Tennant, ballet dancer and dance and performance film producer and director
January 17 – Domenic Troiano, rock guitarist (d.2004)
January 18 – Paul Shmyr, ice hockey player (d.2005)
January 22 – Serge Savard, ice hockey player
January 30 – Jean-Paul Daoust, writer
February 6 – Kate McGarrigle, folk music singer-songwriter (d.2010)
March 1 – Gerry Boulet, rock singer (d.1990)
March 5 – Richard Bell, musician (d.2007)
March 6 – Marcel Proulx, politician
March 7 –  Elaine McCoy, politician (d. 2020)
March 11 – Paul DeVillers, politician
March 19 – Donny Gerrard, singer (d. 2022)
March 22 – Rivka Golani, viola player
March 26 – Marion Boyd, politician (d. 2022)

April to June
April 11 – Donald Orchard, politician
April 15 – David Chatters, politician
April 24 – Doug Christie, lawyer and free speech activist (d.2013)
April 26 – Lorne Nystrom, politician
April 28 – Ginette Reno, author, composer, singer and actress
May 17 – Joan Barfoot, novelist
May 18 – Rod Zaine, ice hockey player  (d.2022)
May 20 – Donald Cameron, politician and Premier of Nova Scotia (d.2021)
May 30 – Don Ferguson, actor and comedian
June 17 – Ernie Eves, politician and 33rd Premier of Ontario
June 24 – David Collenette, politician
June 25 – Andy Anstett, politician
June 25 – Roméo Dallaire, senator, humanitarian, author and retired general

July to September
July 1 – Rosalie Abella, jurist
July 5 – Pierre-Marc Johnson, lawyer, physician, politician and 24th Premier of Quebec
July 6 – John Honderich, businessman and editor (d.2022)
July 10 – Roger Abbott, comedian (d.2011)
July 19 – Dennis Mills, politician and businessman
August 8 – Richard Johnston, politician, educator and administrator
August 29 – Leona Gom, poet and novelist
September 4
 Eric Malling, television journalist (d.1998)
 Greg Sorbara, politician
September 9 
 Lawrence MacAulay, politician
 Bruce Palmer, musician (Buffalo Springfield) (d. 2004)

October to December
October 16 – Elizabeth Witmer, politician
October 28 – Sharon Thesen, poet
November 4 – Robert Davidson, artist
November 12 – Peter Milliken, lawyer and politician
November 17 – Petra Burka, figure skater, Olympic bronze medallist, World Champion and coach
November 17 – Bob McBride, singer (d.1998)
November 22 – Anne Wheeler, film and television writer, producer and director
November 26 – Andreas Schroeder, poet, novelist and nonfiction writer
December 14 – Paul Forseth, politician
December 17 – Eugene Levy, actor, television director, producer, musician and writer

Deaths
 
February 15 – Ernest Howard Armstrong, journalist, politician and Premier of Manitoba (b.1864)
February 21 – Howard Ferguson, politician and 9th Premier of Ontario (b.1870)
August 17 – John Patrick Barry, politician and lawyer (b.1893)
September 9 – Aimé Boucher, politician and notary (b.1877)
October 23 – Ernest Thompson Seton, author and wildlife artist (b.1860)
December 6 – Charles Stewart, politician and 3rd Premier of Alberta (b.1868)
December 25 – Charles Ernest Gault, politician (b.1861)
December 27 – John Babington Macaulay Baxter, lawyer, jurist and 18th Premier of New Brunswick (b.1868)
December 29 – James Thomas Milton Anderson, politician and 5th Premier of Saskatchewan (b.1878)

Full date unknown
John Queen, politician (b.1882)

Historical documents
Canadian issues in postwar Germany include pacification and recovery, export trade, reparations, and punishment of war crimes

British Prime Minister asks PM King not to withdraw occupation forces from Germany, arguing U.K. should not be expected to do all

"Purely and simply the extermination of allied airmen" - evidence that captured flyers accused of "terroristic attacks" were murdered

Testimony against SS physician conducting biological experiments at Dachau concentration camp

Nazis fought "an intellectual battle, the goal of which was the destruction of Christianity and the church"

"A giant quantity of valuables" - testimony that SS profited from clothing, jewellery and other belongings of murdered Jews

PM King announces royal commission to report on leaks of secrets, including to "a foreign mission in Ottawa"

Soviets say PM's announcement tied to "unbridled anti-soviet campaign[...]in the Canadian press and on[...]radio"

"In knowledge, with a sense of proportion" - editorial says there should be no hysteria in hunt for communists

In charge to jury at first espionage trial, judge says conspiracy "touches the very nerve centre of our national existence"

Royal Commission on Espionage final report alleges "spy rings" include federal government employees and military officers

Parsing reaction to Churchill's Iron Curtain speech, Lester Pearson finds U.S. hardening toward U.S.S.R. "depressing if not dangerous"

Real possibility that food situation in Europe, India, China and elsewhere will worsen from "low caloric intake" to starvation

To help end world crisis, Canadians should conserve food and expect less meat, dairy, beer and spirits

Canadian Wheat Board supports giving U.K. priority for wheat over UN Relief and Rehabilitation Administration

"Selective attraction[, not] repulsion" - Senate committee wants end to Immigration Act centred on exclusion ("Asiatic" excepted)

Once veterans' employment has been seen to, Canadians should expect refugee Poles, Ukrainians, Mennonites and ethnic Germans

English woman and baby make voyage with 1,000 other war brides to Halifax and take train to her husband in Calgary

Canadian citizenship, separate from British subject status, created by act specifying how it can be earned and lost, plus status of aliens

Head of U.S. atomic research criticizes U.S.A.-U.K.-Canada agreement to jointly develop atomic energy for peace

U.S.A. asks that Loran network, useful for navigation, guided missiles and early warning, continue in North (request accepted)

Responses from several reserves (Nanaimo to Shubenacadie) to Parliament's query about treaty rights, bands, schools, franchise etc.

Indian residential school principal asks for small tractor to give practical experience to grade 7-9 boys taking mechanics course

Joey Smallwood advocates Newfoundland entering Confederation by laying out federal government's "New Deal" offer to provinces

Film: sleighs loaded and pulled by tractor across Great Slave Lake to Yellowknife

Painting: Portrait of Black member of Canadian Women’s Army Corps

References 

 
Years of the 20th century in Canada
Canada
1946 in North America